Cochemiea boolii is a species of cactus in the subfamily Cactoideae with pink-petaled flowers. It also has a natural defense system of thorns protecting the green base of the plant.  Cochemiea boolii is native to the area around Phoenix, Arizona, found near mostly rocky soils, coastal mountains, and in thin forests and often seen with Echinocereus scopulorum, Echinocereus engelmannii, Mammillaria swinglei, and Ferocactus emoryi. Mammillaria boolii is  considered "near threatened" by IUCN and is under threat by urban development.

References

Plants described in 1953
boolii